Al Madina Insurance Company SAOG (commonly known as Al Madina Takaful) is an Omani takaful company. 

It was founded in 2006 as an insurance company. In 2014, the Capital Market Authority granted Al Madina a takaful license. Al Madina then converted all its insurance business to become Sharia-compliant and became the first takaful company in Oman. 

After the conversion, Al Madina embarked on acquisitions to expand its operations. In 2014, it invested in a 9.5 percent stake (along with its major shareholder MB Holding) in Abu Dhabi-based takaful operator Watania for AED 17.9 million. 

In 2014, Al Madina had a customer base of 37,000 policyholders.

References

External links
 

Takaful companies of Oman
Financial services companies established in 2006
Companies based in Muscat, Oman